Mark Haddon (born 28 October 1962) is an English novelist, best known for The Curious Incident of the Dog in the Night-Time (2003). He won the Whitbread Award, the Dolly Gray Children's Literature Award, Guardian Prize, and a Commonwealth Writers Prize for his work.

Life, work and studies

In 2003, Haddon won the Whitbread Book of the Year Award—in the Novels rather than Children's Books category—for The Curious Incident of the Dog in the Night-Time. He also won the Commonwealth Writers Prize in the Best First Book category, as The Curious Incident was considered his first book written for adults; he also won the Guardian Children's Fiction Prize, a once-in-a-lifetime award judged by a panel of children's writers. The book was furthermore long listed for the 2003 Man Booker Prize.

The Curious Incident is written from the perspective of an autistic 15-year-old boy, Christopher John Francis Boone. In an interview at Powells.com, Haddon claimed that this was the first book that he wrote intentionally for an adult audience; he was surprised when his publisher suggested marketing it to both adult and child audiences (it has been very successful with adults and children alike).

His short story "The Pier Falls" was longlisted for the 2015 Sunday Times EFG Private Bank Short Story Award, the richest prize in the world for a single short story.

Personal life
Haddon is a vegetarian. He describes himself as a "hard-line atheist."

Haddon lives in Oxford with his wife Sos Eltis, a Fellow of Brasenose College, Oxford, and their two sons.

Works 

Gilbert's Gobstopper (1987)
Toni and the Tomato Soup (1988)
A Narrow Escape for Princess Sharon (1989)
Agent Z Meets the Masked Crusader (1993)
Titch Johnson, Almost World Champion (1993)
Agent Z Goes Wild (1994)
At Home
At Playgroup
In the Garden
On Holiday
Gridzbi Spudvetch! (1992)
The Real Porky Philips (1994)
Agent Z and the Penguin from Mars (1995)
The Sea of Tranquility (1996)
Secret Agent Handbook
Agent Z and the Killer Bananas (2001)
Ocean Star Express (2001)
The Ice Bear's Cave (2002)
The Curious Incident of the Dog in the Night-Time (2003)
Boom! (An improved version of Gridzbi Spudvetch) (2009)

For adults
The Curious Incident of the Dog in the Night-Time (2003)
A Spot of Bother (2006)
The Red House (2012)
The Pier Falls (2016)
The Porpoise (2019)
Social Distance (graphic novel, 2020)

Poetry 
 The Talking Horse and the Sad Girl  and the Village Under the Sea

Play 
Polar Bears (2010)

See also

References

External links
 
 
 
 Mark Haddon discussed the rituals and processes that guides his work.
 The Curious Incident of the Dog in the Night-time (official)
 A Spot of Bother (official)
 Interview: Coming Down the Mountain
 Haddon, Mark. "Writers' rooms: Mark Haddon", The Guardian (London), 29 June 2007. Retrieved 31 May 2011.
 Freeman, Hadley. "Novelist Mark Haddon talks to Hadley Freeman", The Guardian (London), 29 May 2006. Retrieved 31 May 2011.

1962 births
Living people
20th-century English male writers
20th-century English novelists
21st-century English male writers
21st-century English novelists
Alumni of Merton College, Oxford
British republicans
British social commentators
Costa Book Award winners
English atheists
English children's writers
English male novelists
English male screenwriters
English screenwriters
Guardian Children's Fiction Prize winners
New Statesman people
People educated at Uppingham School
People from Northampton
O. Henry Award winners